The Texas Longhorns women's cross country team is coached by Edrick Floréal. They have won 4 Southwest Conference championships and the 1986 NCAA Cross Country Championship.

Yearly Record

Source

See also
Texas Longhorns men's cross country
Texas Longhorns men's track and field
Texas Longhorns women's track and field

References

Women's sports in Texas